Vallancey Brown (7 December 1912 – 24 October 1987) was an Australian cricketer. He played one first-class cricket match for Victoria in 1935.

See also
 List of Victoria first-class cricketers

References

External links
 

1912 births
1987 deaths
Australian cricketers
Victoria cricketers
Cricketers from Sydney